The tenth season of the American reality talent show The Voice premiered on February 29, 2016 on NBC. Carson Daly returned as the show's host. Adam Levine, Blake Shelton, and Pharrell Williams all returned as coaches. Meanwhile, Christina Aguilera returned after a one-season hiatus, replacing Gwen Stefani who did not return as a coach for this season, however instead served as an advisor for Team Blake in the Battle Rounds. 

For the first time in the show's history, iTunes bonus multipliers were now applied to performances for live performances during the finals in addition to the "Cumulative iTunes Vote Total"; duets were now made eligible for downloads but does not count as a vote for iTunes, although this would later became intact a year later in season twelve.

Alisan Porter was named the winner of the season, marking Aguilera's first and only win as a coach and Porter the oldest female winner. Aguilera also became the first female coach to win a season of The Voice.

Coaches and hosts
Adam Levine and Blake Shelton returned for their tenth season as coaches. Pharrell Williams returned for his fourth season and Christina Aguilera returned for her sixth season, after a season's hiatus. The advisor for this season was next season's coach Miley Cyrus, who served as an advisor for all teams during the Knockouts.

Auditions

The open call auditions were held in the following locations.

Teams
 Color key

Blind auditions
Color key

Episode 1 (Feb. 29)

Episode 2 (March 1)

Episode 3 (March 7)

Episode 4 (March 8)

Episode 5 (March 9)
This episode covered the Best of the Blind Auditions and a sneak peek of the next stage of competition, the Battle Rounds.

Episode 6 (March 14)
The sixth episode included the last of the Blind Auditions as well as the first Battles. All of the coaches performed "I Wish".

The Battles
The Battles (from the second half of episode 6 to episode 9) consisted of two 2-hour episodes, one 1-hour and one special episodes each on March 14, 15, 21 and 22, 2016. Season ten's advisors included: Tori Kelly for Team Adam, Sean 'Diddy' Combs for Team Pharrell, Patti LaBelle for Team Christina and Gwen Stefani for Team Blake. Each coach can exercise the use of two "Steals" for this round.

Color key:

The Knockouts
For the Knockouts, Miley Cyrus was assigned as a mentor for contestants in all four teams. The coaches can each steal one losing artist. The top 20 contestants, plus four receiving the Coach Comeback from either the Knockouts or the earlier Battles, will then move on to the "Live Shows."

Color key:

1 Daniel Passino is on Team Pharrell for the Live Shows 
2 Nick Hagelin is on Team Christina for the Live Shows

Live shows
The Live Shows are the final phase of the competition, consisting of seven weeks of shows beginning with the playoffs and a live finale.

Color key:

Week 1: Live Playoffs (April 11, 12 & 13)
The Live Playoffs comprised episodes 14, 15, and 16. 24 artists perform for a public vote; the top two artists per each team advances via public vote, while the bottom four artists compete for the coaches' save in the results show. The Monday night broadcast featured Teams Blake and Christina, the Tuesday night broadcast featured Teams Adam and Pharrell, and the Wednesday night broadcast featured the results.

Week 2: Top 12 (April 18 & 19)
From weeks two to five, two artists with the fewest votes compete for an Instant Save, with one leaving the competition each week until the semifinals. iTunes bonus multipliers were awarded to Adam Wakefield (#7) and Alisan Porter (#9).

Week 3: Top 11 (April 25 & 26)
None of the artists reached the top 10 on iTunes, so no bonuses were awarded.

Week 4: Top 10 (May 2 & 3)
iTunes bonus multiplier was awarded to Porter (#6).

Week 5: Top 9 (May 9 & 10)
iTunes bonus multipliers were awarded to Wakefield (#9) and Laith Al-Saadi (#10). This week's Instant Save was the second closest in the show's history, with Paxton and Nick tied for most of the voting window; Paxton was saved with a difference of nearly 100 votes.

Week 6: Semifinals (May 16 & 17)
Four artists were eliminated on the semifinals. During the results, the top three artists with the most votes were immediately advanced the finals, the bottom two artists with the fewest votes were eliminated immediately, and the middle three artists were eligible for the Instant Save. In addition to their individual songs, each artist performed a duet with another artist in the competition, though these duets were not available for purchase on iTunes. iTunes bonus multipliers were awarded to Wakefield (#2), Porter (#3), Hannah Huston (#5), Mary Sarah (#6), Bryan Bautista (#7) and Al-Saadi (#10). All four coaches had an artist advance to the finals for the first time ever since season 1 and season 2 (which was team-based rather than individual), thus becoming the first season in The Voice history to achieve this distinction organically. Pink served as a mentor for the semifinalists on all four teams.

Week 7: Finale (May 23 & 24)
The Top four performed on Monday, May 23, 2016, with the final results following on Tuesday, May 24, 2016. Finalists performed a solo song, a duet with their coach, and an original song. In a change from the previous seasons, iTunes bonus multipliers were extended to songs performed in the final performance show. iTunes bonus multipliers were awarded to Wakefield (#1 and #9), Huston (#3 and #7), Porter (#4 and #5) and Al-Saadi (#6). All iTunes votes received for the six weeks leading up to the finale were cumulatively added to online and app finale votes for each finalist.

 Originally, Owen Danoff was among the artists recruited by Al-Saadi for his performance prior to Danoff's absence.

Elimination chart

Overall
Color key
Artist's info

Result details

Team
Color key
Artist's info

Result details

Ratings

Controversy and criticism
The show faced controversy when Katherine Ho, a contestant on Team Adam, was the second contestant in the history of the show to make it to the third round of the competition and have all of her performances, including her Blind Audition, Battle, and Knockout round, montaged (not shown in full).

According to Matt Carter, "It's not often that we write an article on 'The Voice' that is about a contestant being triple-montaged, mostly because it is such a rare phenomenon, but here we are with it happening to Katherine Ho.
When it a triple-montage does happen, it just makes it all the more frustrating since it eliminates the purpose of the show. We know that there is no guarantee that you are going to get airtime when you audition for the show, but we do think for the most part you should get a little more attention than Katherine Ho got over the course of the competition. Her Battle Round performance of Caroline Burns was not really shown, and this puts her in a similar camp with Rebekah Samarin back in season 7 of the show. They made it far enough on the show that they cannot audition again, and yet they don't really get a lot of publicity – it's pretty unfair.

Here's the most egregious thing about this performance tonight: We don't even know what Katherine sang! She just didn't get any attention at all."

Performances by guests/coaches

Artists who appeared on previous shows or seasons
Alisan Porter was the youngest person to win Star Search at the age of five, and is known for her role as Curly Sue in the 1991 movie of the same name.
Mary Sarah won second place in the Teen Category of the 2010 International Songwriting Competition, for her self-penned song "New Crush."
Tamar Davis appeared on Star Search as a member of Girl's Tyme and later as a solo act, and also auditioned for season four of American Idol.
Bryan Bautista, Caroline Burns, Joe Maye, and Natalie Yacovazzi all auditioned for the ninth season, but all of them failed to turn a chair.
After failing to turn a chair this season, Maddie Poppe went on to win American Idol season 16.
Jonathan Bach later appeared on eighteenth season of American Idol where he eliminated during Hollywood Week.

References

External links 

Season 10
2016 American television seasons